The Constitution of the People's Republic of China is the supreme law of the People's Republic of China. It was adopted by the 5th National People's Congress on December 4, 1982, with further revisions about every five years. It is the fourth constitution in PRC history, superseding the 1954 constitution, the 1975 constitution, and the 1978 constitution.

History

The first Constitution of the People's Republic of China was declared in 1954. After two intervening versions enacted in 1975 and 1978, the current Constitution was declared in 1982. There were significant differences between each of these versions, and the 1982 Constitution has subsequently been amended five times. In addition, evolving constitutional conventions have led to significant changes in the structure of the Chinese government in the absence of changes in the text of the Constitution.

Structure

Preamble
General Principles (Chapter 1)
The Fundamental Rights and Duties of Citizens (Chapter 2)
The Structure of the State (Chapter 3) — which includes such state organs as the National People's Congress，the President of the People's Republic of China, the State Council, the Central Military Commission, the Local People's Congresses at All Levels and Local People's Governments at All Levels, the Autonomous Organs of Ethnic Autonomous Areas,the Commissions of Supervision, and the People's Courts and People's Procuratorates.
The National Flag, the National Anthem, the National Emblem and the Capital (Chapter 4).

1982 Constitution 

There had been five major revisions by the National People's Congress (NPC) to the 1982 Constitution.  The 1982 State Constitution provided a legal basis for the broad changes in China's social and economic institutions and significantly revised government structure. The posts of President and Vice President (which were abolished in the 1975 and 1978 constitutions) are re-established in the 1982 Constitution.

Prior to 1982 there were no term limits on key leadership posts. Deng imposed a two-term limit (10 years total) on all but the chair of the Central Military Commission.

Much of the PRC Constitution is modeled after the 1936 Constitution of the Soviet Union, but there are some significant differences.  For example, while the Soviet constitution contains an explicit right of secession, the Chinese constitution explicitly forbids secession.  While the Soviet constitution formally creates a federal system, the Chinese constitution formally creates a unitary multi-national state.

The 1982 Constitution is a lengthy, hybrid document with 138 articles. Large sections were adapted directly from the 1978 constitution, but many of its changes derive from the 1954 constitution. Specifically, the new Constitution de-emphasizes class struggle and places top priority on development and on incorporating the contributions and interests of non-party groups that can play a central role in modernization.

Article 1 of the Constitution describes China as "a socialist state under the people's democratic dictatorship" meaning that the system is based on an alliance of the working classes—in communist terminology, the workers and peasants—and is led by the Chinese Communist Party (CCP), the vanguard of the working class. Elsewhere, the Constitution provides for a renewed and vital role for the groups that make up that basic alliance—the CPPCC, democratic parties, and mass organizations.

The 1982 Constitution expunges almost all of the rhetoric associated with the Cultural Revolution incorporated in the 1978 version. In fact, the Constitution omits all references to the Cultural Revolution and restates Chairman Mao Zedong's contributions in accordance with a major historical reassessment produced in June 1981 at the Sixth Plenum of the Eleventh Central Committee, the "Resolution on Some Historical Issues of the Party since the Founding of the People's Republic."

Emphasis is also placed throughout the 1982 State Constitution on socialist law as a regulator of political behaviour. Unlike the 1977 Soviet Constitution, the text of the Constitution itself originally didn't explicitly mention the Chinese Communist Party outside the preamble.

Thus, the rights and obligations of citizens are set out in detail far exceeding that provided in the 1978 constitution. Probably because the Cultural Revolution was "characterized by violence and chaos," the 1982 Constitution gives even greater attention to clarifying citizens' "fundamental rights and duties" than the 1954 constitution did, like the right to vote and to run for election begins at the age of eighteen except for those disenfranchised by law. The Constitution also guarantees the freedom of religious worship as well as the "freedom not to believe in any religion" and affirms that "religious bodies and religious affairs are not subject to any foreign domination."

Article 35 of the 1982 Constitution proclaims that "citizens of the People's Republic of China enjoy freedom of speech, of the press, of assembly, of association, of procession, and of demonstration." In the 1978 constitution, these rights were guaranteed, but so were the right to strike and the "four big rights", often called the "four bigs": to speak out freely, air views fully, hold great debates, and write big-character posters. In February 1980, following the Democracy Wall period, the four bigs were abolished in response to a party decision ratified by the National People's Congress. The right to strike was also dropped from the 1982 Constitution. The widespread expression of the four big rights during the student protests of late 1986 elicited the regime's strong censure because of their illegality. The official response cited Article 53 of the 1982 Constitution, which states that citizens must abide by the law and observe labor discipline and public order. Besides being illegal, practising the four big rights offered the possibility of straying into criticism of the Chinese Communist Party, which was in fact what appeared in student wall posters. In a new era that strove for political stability and economic development, party leaders considered the four big rights politically destabilizing. Chinese citizens are prohibited from forming new political parties.

Among the political rights granted by the constitution, all Chinese citizens have rights to elect and be elected. According to the later promulgated election law, rural residents had only 1/4 vote power of townsmen (formerly 1/8). As Chinese citizens are categorized into rural resident and town resident, and the constitution has no stipulation of freedom of transference, those rural residents are restricted by the Hukou (registered permanent residence) and have fewer political, economic, and educational rights. This problem has largely been addressed with various and ongoing reforms of Hukou in 2007. The fore-said ratio of vote power has been readjusted to 1:1 by an amendment to the election law passed in March 2010.

The 1982 State Constitution is also more specific about the responsibilities and functions of offices and organs in the state structure. There are clear admonitions against familiar Chinese practices that the reformers have labelled abuses, such as concentrating power in the hands of a few leaders and permitting lifelong tenure in leadership positions. On the other hand, the constitution strongly oppose the western system of separation of powers by executive, legislature and judicial. It stipulates the NPC as the highest organ of state authority power, under which the State Council, the Supreme People's Court, and the Supreme People's Procuratorate are responsible to.

In addition, the 1982 Constitution provides an extensive legal framework for the liberalizing economic policies of the 1980s. It allows the collective economic sector not owned by the state a broader role and provides for limited private economic activity. Members of the expanded rural collectives have the right "to farm private plots, engage in household sideline production, and raise privately owned livestock." The primary emphasis is given to expanding the national economy, which is to be accomplished by balancing centralized economic planning with supplementary regulation by the market.

Another key difference between the 1978 and 1982 state constitutions is the latter's approach to outside help for the modernization program. Whereas the 1978 constitution stressed "self-reliance" in modernization efforts, the 1982 document provides the constitutional basis for the considerable body of laws passed by the NPC in subsequent years permitting and encouraging extensive foreign participation in all aspects of the economy. In addition, the 1982 document reflects the more flexible and less ideological orientation of foreign policy since 1978. Such phrases as "proletarian internationalism" and "social imperialism" have been dropped.

Revisions and amendments

7th National People's Congress (1988)

The National People's Congress amended Articles 10 and 11 of the Constitution. Allow the emergence of the private sector and allow the transfer of the Land tenure.

8th National People's Congress (1993)

9th National People's Congress (1999)

10th National People's Congress (2004)

The Constitution was amended on 14 March 2004 to include guarantees regarding private property ("legally obtained private property of the citizens shall not be violated") and human rights ("the State respects and protects human rights"). The government argued that this represented progress for Chinese democracy and was a sign from the Communist Party that they recognised the need to adapt to the booming Chinese economy, which had created a growing middle class who wanted private property protections.

Chinese leader Hu Jintao said that "These amendments of the Chinese constitution are of great importance to the development of China [...] We will make serious efforts to carry them out in practice."

13th National People's Congress (2018)

The Constitution was amended on 11 March 2018, with 2,958 votes in favour, two against, and three abstentions. It includes an assortment of revisions that further cement the Communist Party's control and supremacy, including setting up the National Supervisory Commission, establishing a new anti-graft agency, extending the powers of the Communist Party's graft watchdog, adding Hu Jintao's Scientific Outlook on Development and Xi Jinping Thought to the Preamble of the Constitution, and removing term limits for both the President and Vice President, enabling Xi Jinping to remain president indefinitely. Xi is also the General Secretary of the Chinese Communist Party, the de facto top position in Communist Party ruling China without term limit. The amendment also adds the phrases "Communist Party of China" and its "leadership" into the main body of the Constitution. Prior to the amendment, the CCP and its leadership were only mentioned in the preamble. Constitutional preambles are often not legally binding (as with the United States constitution), and as the legal applicability of the Chinese constitution is debated the amendment may be seen as providing a constitutional basis for China's status as a one-party state and formally rendering any competitive multi-party system unconstitutional. Xi "now has the distinction of being the first Chinese leader ever to have his theories enshrined in the constitution during his own lifetime." The leadership of the CPC is now constitutionally enshrined as the "defining feature of socialism with Chinese characteristics", and therefore it establishes one-party rule as an end-in-itself. Xi says:

Constitutional enforcement
The constitution stipulates that the National People's Congress (NPC) and its Standing Committee have the power to review whether laws or activities violate the constitution. Unlike many Western legal systems, courts do not have the power of judicial review and cannot invalidate a statute on the grounds that it violates the constitution.

Since 2002, a special committee within the NPC called the National People's Congress Constitution and Law Committee has been responsible for constitutional review and enforcement. The committee has never explicitly ruled that a law or regulation is unconstitutional. However, in one case, after media outcry over the death of Sun Zhigang the State Council was forced to rescind regulations allowing police to detain persons without residency permits after the Standing Committee of the National People's Congress (NPCSC) made it clear that it would rule such regulations unconstitutional.

In January 2020, the  conducted a constitutional review, targeting the relevant provisions in local regulations concerning that "schools of all levels and types of ethnic minorities should use the language of the ethnic group or the language commonly used by the ethnic group for teaching" and that "some courses in minority schools with conditions can be taught in Chinese with the approval of the local education administration department". The Legislative Affairs Committee found that the above-mentioned provisions are inconsistent with the provisions of Article 19, paragraph 5 of the Constitution on promotion of Putonghua and the provisions in National Common Language Law, Education Law and other relevant laws. Local authorities have been ordered to make changes.

In November 2020, the 13th NPC Standing Committee adopted , which referred to Article 64, item 1 of the Constitution on interpreting the Constitution.

Criticisms
The Open Constitution Initiative was an organization consisting of lawyers and academics in the People's Republic of China that advocated the rule of law and greater constitutional protections. It was shut down by the government on July 14, 2009.

In early 2013, a movement developed among reformers in China based on enforcing the provisions of the constitution.

In 2019, Ling Li of the University of Vienna and Wenzhang Zhou of Zhejiang University wrote that "the constitution appeals to [the CCP] because it does not provide solutions to fundamental issues of governance. Instead, such issues are kept out of the constitution so that they can be addressed by the Party through other regulatory mechanisms outside of the constitutional realm."

See also 

 Constitutional economics
 Constitutional history of the People's Republic of China
 Constitutional law
 Constitutionalism
 Law of the People's Republic of China
 Constitution of the Chinese Communist Party

Notes

References

Citations

Sources

External links 

 Official Translation of the Constitution of the People's Republic of China
 The Constitution of the People's Republic of China - Official Chinese text
 English translation of the Constitution of the People's Republic of China, incorporating amendments up to 2018
 English version of the Constitution of the People's Republic of China, incorporating amendments up to 2004
 The National People's Congress of the People's Republic of China: Constitution of the People's Republic of China (Full text after amendment on March 14, 2004)

1982 in law
Constitution of China
Government of China
Laws of China
Politics of China